Patrick Thomas Tennyson (born 16 May 1979) is an Irish hurler who played as a midfielder for the Kilkenny senior team.

Brother of Kilkenny hurler John, Tennyson joined the team during the 2002 Walsh Cup and was a regular member of the team for just three seasons. During that time he won two National Hurling League winners' medals on the field of play.

At club level Tennyson is a Leinster and county club championship medalist with Carrickshock in the intermediate grade. All Ireland Intermediate Club Championship winner 2017.

References

1979 births
Living people
Carrickshock hurlers
Kilkenny inter-county hurlers